Renegade Force (aka Counterforce and Rogue Force) is a 1998 action film, starring Michael Rooker, Robert Patrick, Diane DiLascio and Louis Mandylor. The movie was written by Rick Bloggs and Alan Schechter and directed by Martin Kunert.

Plot
Rooker plays an FBI agent who joins force with a cop (Diane DiLascio) to investigate some mysterious deaths of several mobsters.

Cast
 Michael Rooker as Matt Cooper
 Robert Patrick as Jake McInroy
 Diane DiLascio as Helen Simms
 Louis Mandylor as Peter Roth

Reception
Comeuppance Reviews called Renegade Force a "brainless action at its best", stating: "In the end: Rogue Force is 90 minutes of cool FBI\SWAT action. The plot is routine but who cares when you're having a good time?". Movie Mavs gave the film 3,5 stars out of 4, praised several aspects of the movie and concluding: "Rogue Force is a better than average corrupt police themed adult thriller, with some solid acting."

References

External links
 
 

1990s English-language films